Paurina Gwanyanya Mpariwa (born 1964), sometimes written as Paurine Mpariwa, is a member of the Pan-African Parliament from Zimbabwe. Mpariwa is the chair of the Public Accounts Committee.

She is also a member of the Parliament of Zimbabwe, first elected in 2000 and again in 2005, representing the Mukafose constituency in Harare. She is a member of the Movement for Democratic Change (MDC) party. On 10 February 2009, Morgan Tsvangirai designated Mpariwa for the position of Minister of Labour and Social Welfare as part of the national unity government. She is the Member of House of Assembly for Mufakose (MDC-T).

Mpariwa was also chairperson for Women's Parliamentary Caucus, chairperson Women in Law and Development in Africa (WILDAF), Zimbabwe Parliament Treasurer Women Caucus, parliamentary deputy chairperson Portfolio for Labour, parliamentary deputy whip, Pan African Parliament rapporteur for health, labour and social welfare.

Life
Born in Mufakose 1964, Paurina Mpariwa trained in personnel management, industrial relations, business studies, para-legal work, social work finance and computers.

Unionism
Participation in labour unionism started while working at OK chain stores early 1990s, rising to become the chairperson for the Commercial Workers' Union of Zimbabwe.

References

Living people
Members of the Pan-African Parliament from Zimbabwe
Members of the National Assembly of Zimbabwe
21st-century Zimbabwean women politicians
21st-century Zimbabwean politicians
Women members of the Pan-African Parliament
Women government ministers of Zimbabwe
1964 births
Zimbabwean trade unionists